Edward Ryley (or Riley) Langworthy (1797 - 7 April 1874) was a British businessman and an independent but Whig-leaning politician.

Langworthy was born in London, the son of a Somerset merchant. After spending some years in South and Central America, he moved to Salford, Lancashire in 1840 to establish a cotton business with his brother, George. Langworthy Brothers and Company was established at Greengate Mills.

When Salford was incorporated as a municipal borough in 1844, Langworthy was elected as the first alderman for Trinity ward. He was the borough's fifth mayor, elected for two consecutive terms from 1848 to 1850. His term as mayor saw the establishment of the free public museum and library at Peel Park

In January 1857, Salford's Whig Member of Parliament, Joseph Brotherton, died. Langworthy was selected as the party's candidate for the vacancy, and as the only nominee, was elected unopposed on 2 February. Following his election he gave a speech outlining his political views: he supported the temperance movement, free trade and civil and religious freedom, the reform of parliament, strengthened local government, but opposed any increase in the size of the country's armed forces. He was only Salford's MP for a matter of months, as he did not stand at the subsequent general election later in the year.

Langworthy retained his connection with Salford Corporation, and on his death in 1874 left £10,000 to the museum and library he had helped establish. Langworthy Road, constructed shortly after his death, was named in his memory by Salford Borough Council.

References

External links 
 

1797 births
1874 deaths
Independent members of the House of Commons of the United Kingdom
UK MPs 1852–1857
Members of the Parliament of the United Kingdom for Salford
Mayors of Salford